The 2014–15 Premier League of Bosnia and Herzegovina, also known as BH Telecom Premier League for sponsorship reasons, is the fifteenth season of the Premier League of Bosnia and Herzegovina, the highest football league of Bosnia and Herzegovina, since its original establishment in 2000 and twelfth as a unified country-wide league. It began on 2 August 2014 and will end sometimes on 23 May 2015, with a winter break between late November 2014 and late February/early March 2015. The official fixture schedule was released in late June/early July 2014.

The 2014–15 will see the return of clubs such as FK Sloboda Tuzla and FK Drina Zvornik to top flight as promoted, instead of FK Rudar Prijedor and FK Leotar.

Teams

A total of 16 teams will contest the league, including 14 sides from the 2013–14 season and two promoted from each of the second-level league.

Stadiums and locations

Personnel and kits

Note: Flags indicate national team as has been defined under FIFA eligibility rules. Players and Managers may hold more than one non-FIFA nationality.

Managerial changes

League table

Results

Top goalscorers

References

External links
 
2014–15 Premier League of Bosnia and Herzegovina at SportSport.ba 

2014-15
Bos
1